S. indica may refer to:
 Salvia indica, a herbaceous perennial plant species
 Saraca indica, the Ashoka tree, a plant species
 Sillago indica, the Indian whiting, a coastal marine fish species
 Singerina indica, the single species in the monotypic genus Singerina

Synonyms
 Sida indica, a synonym for Abutilon indicum, an invasive plant species
 Spathodea indica, a synonym for Oroxylum indicum, a tree species
 Sphaerotheca indica, a synonym for Podosphaera xanthii

See also
 Indica (disambiguation)